Jacob van Hoogstraten (c. 1460 – 24 January 1527) was a Flemish Dominican theologian and controversialist.

Education, professor 
Van Hoogstraten was born in Hoogstraten, Burgundian Netherlands (now in Belgium).  He studied the classics and theology with the Dominicans at Old University of Leuven. In 1485 was among the first in the history of that institution to receive the degree of Master of Arts. He there entered the order, and after his ordination to the priesthood in 1496, he matriculated in the University of Cologne to continue his theological studies. At the general chapter held in 1498 at Ferrara he was appointed professor of theology at the Dominican college of Cologne. In 1500 he was elected prior of the Dominican convent in Antwerp. On the expiration of his term of office he returned to Cologne, where, in February, 1504, he received the degree of Doctor of Theology.  At the general chapter of the Dominican Order held in Pavia in 1507 he was made regent of studies, and thereby became professor of theology at the university. His vast theological attainments and his natural ability to impart knowledge made him an exceptionally successful teacher.

As controversialist, Inquisitor 
Van Hoogstraten began his controversial career by publishing in 1507 Defensorium fratrum mendicantium contra curatos illos qui privilegia fratrum injuste impugnat (Cologne) in defence of the mendicant orders, who had been accused of abusing their privileges. In the following year he published several works against the eminent Italian jurist, Pietro Tomasi of Ravenna, who was then lecturing in the German universities. During his controversy with the Italian jurist he was elected prior of the convent of Cologne, and thus became inquisitor general of the archbishoprics of Cologne, Mainz, and Trier.

Opposition to Judaism and Lutheranism

He played his principal role in the controversy on the confiscation of Hebrew books, in which with Johann Reuchlin defended preserving those books against the calls of the converted Jew Johannes Pfefferkorn to destroy these books, in particular the Talmud. While van Hoogstraten took no active part in the earlier stages of the controversy, his sympathies were with Reuchlin's opponents as evidenced by his close relationship with Pfefferkorn. Influenced no doubt, to some extent by the unfavourable attitude of the universities towards the Jewish books, van Hoogstraten on 15 September 1513, in his capacity as inquisitor, summoned Reuchlin to appear within six days before the ecclesiastical court of Mainz to answer to the charges of favouring the Jews and their anti-Christian literature. The latter appealed to Rome; whereupon Pope Leo X authorized the Bishop of Speyer to decide the matter. Meanwhile, van Hoogstraten had Reuchlin's Augenspiegel, a previously published retort to Pfefferkorn's Handspiegel, publicly burned at Cologne. On 29 March 1514, the Bishop of Speyer announced that the Augenspiegel contained nothing injurious to the Catholic Faith, pronounced judgment in favour of Reuchlin, and condemned van Hoogstraten to pay the expenses consequent upon the process. The latter appealed to Rome, but the pope postponed the trial indefinitely. At the instance of Franz von Sickingen and others, the Dominicans deprived van Hoogstraten of the office of prior and inquisitor, but in January, 1520, the pope annulled the decision of the Bishop of Speyer, condemned the Augenspiegel, and reinstated van Hoogstraten.

Van Hoogstraten was the initial inquisitor who in 1523 sentenced to death Jan van Essen and Hendrik Vos, the first Lutherans to die as martyrs for their beliefs.  

Van Hoogstraten died in Cologne on 24 January 1527.

See also
 Hochstratus Ovans

Bibliography
Among the other works of van Hoogstraten besides those already mentioned, the following are the more important:
Defensio scholastica principum Alemanniæ in eo, quod sceleratos detinent insepultos in ligno contra P. Ravennatem (Cologne, 1508);
Justificatorium principum Alemanniæ, dissolvens rationes Petri Ravennatis, quibus Principum judicia carpsit (Cologne, 1508);
Tractatus de cadaveribus maleficorum morte punitorum (Cologne, 1508);
Tractatus magistralis, declarans quam graviter peccent quærentes auxilium a maleficis (Cologne, 1510);
Apologia Fr. Jacobi Hoogstraeten (Cologne, 1518);
Apologia altera (Cologne, 1519);
Destructio cabbalæ (Cologne, 1519);
Margarita moralis philosophiæ in duodecim redacta libros (Cologne, 1521).

References

1460s births
1527 deaths
Year of birth uncertain
Roman Catholic theologians of the Habsburg Netherlands
Flemish Dominicans
Inquisitors
People from Hoogstraten
Roman Catholic priests of the Habsburg Netherlands